Victorious Boxers 2: Fighting Spirit is the North American sequel to Victorious Boxers: Ippo's Road to Glory. In Japan, it is actually the third game in the series to be released on the PlayStation 2. Because of this, it is sometimes confused with the actual second Japanese game, . Like its predecessor, it is based on the anime and manga series Hajime no Ippo.

The fights in the game mirrored the fights that took place in the manga series. The beginning of the game focuses on Ippo Makunouchi's rise up the Japanese Featherweight ranks, and includes the fights of Ippo's fellow gym mates. The storyline, which unfolds in the story mode, takes place in various linear segments in the game.

Gameplay

Controls - The controls are very similar to its predecessor. There are both offensive and defensive types of moves. Defensive moves include dashing, bobbing, weaving and guarding. Offensive moves include standard boxing maneuvers like jabs, hooks and uppercuts.

Modes
Story Mode - The story mode is a single player mode that follows the boxing careers of the main characters from the manga/anime series. There are three different difficulty settings: easy, normal, or hard.

Exhibition Mode - The exhibition mode is a multi player versus mode where players can compete against each other. Initially, only a small number of characters are available, but more characters become available by playing through the story mode. Players can adjust the number of rounds, knockdowns, and the style of the count for the match. Players can also adjust a character's level of power, speed, and stamina.

Tournament Mode - Player(s) can compete in tournament style gameplay with either 4, 8, or 16 fighters.

Plot and setting

The story is based on the Japanese manga/anime series , which was released in North America as Fighting Spirit.

Characters

The game features over 70 boxers.

Story

Development

Victorious Boxers 2 was released in Japan in celebration of the manga series', Fighting Spirit, 15th anniversary.

Reception

Like the first Victorious Boxers, this game had a relatively unknown release. Though very similar to the first, it received "mixed" reviews according to the review aggregation website Metacritic. In Japan, Famitsu gave it a score of 28 out of 40.

PALGN said that the game was a "reasonable boxing title" that could have done better if released earlier. They also stated that fans of the anime and manga would enjoy it. Eurogamer said that while many gamers may prefer games like the Fight Night series over Victorious Boxers 2, "it's certainly an acquired taste that proves satisfying if you give it time to beef up".

References

External links
 

2004 video games
Boxing video games
Empire Interactive games
Entertainment Software Publishing games
Fighting games
Hajime no Ippo
Multiplayer and single-player video games
PlayStation 2 games
PlayStation 2-only games
RenderWare games
Video games based on anime and manga
Video games developed in Japan